Alexandre Prémat (born 5 November 1982) is a French racing driver. He won the Pirtek Enduro Cup for Triple Eight Race Engineering alongside Shane van Gisbergen in 2016. He also won the 2019 Supercheap Auto Bathurst 1000 with Scott McLaughlin, driving for DJR Team Penske.

Career

Karting & French Formula Renault Campus
Born in Juvisy-sur-Orge, Essonne, Prémat started his motorsport career in karting at the age of 10. In 1998 the French driver became champion in «Ile-de-France». In 2000 he finished as runner-up in 125cc ICC European Championship.

He continued karting until 2000 when he moved up to French Formula Campus, a common starting point for Formula drivers from France.

Formula Renault
He quickly moved up to French Formula Renault in 2001, and after familiarising himself with the series, won the title in 2002. In 2002 he also raced in part of the Formula Renault 2000 Eurocup.

Formula Three
With the merger of several national Formula Three championships in 2003, Prémat moved to the resultant Formula Three Euroseries, driving for the ASM team with Olivier Pla, another driver who raced in the inaugural GP2 season. He stayed there for the 2004 season, also winning the prestigious Macau Grand Prix and Marlboro Masters non-championship races.

GP2 Series

This earned him a drive in the 2005 GP2 Series, for ART Grand Prix, the team ran by Nicolas Todt. He was behind team-mate Nico Rosberg, but was the highest-place second driver in the championship. Alex remained, alongside the young British driver Lewis Hamilton for 2006, though he was overshadowed, as he finished third whilst Hamilton took the honours.

A1 Grand Prix
Prémat also drove the A1 Team France car in A1 Grand Prix in the 2005–06 season, he and team-mate Nicolas Lapierre winning the title for their nation. Alex did not return to the series for the following season, and the French team's form dropped noticeably.

Formula One
Prémat drove the third Spyker MF1 Racing car at the 2006 Chinese Grand Prix. He also had an off-season test with Champ Car team Mi-Jack Conquest Racing. Prémat had the quickest time in several sessions and stated that he was targeting a ride in Champ Cars for 2007. Another possibility was to drive in Formula One with Spyker, as one of their test drivers, but it did not work out.

Deutsche Tourenwagen Masters and Le Mans Series
Eventually he drove for Audi in the 2007 DTM series and participated in the 24 Hours of Le Mans, also with Audi. In 2008 Prémat again raced in DTM, and also the Le Mans Series with Audi. In 2009 French driver remained in this series and also participated in 24 Hours of Le Mans. He was fired by Audi before the final race of the 2010 season for running in the New York Marathon instead of recovering from a heavy crash at the previous round. In 2011 he won his class of the Nürburgring 24 Hour race in a Peugeot RCZ.

Supercars Championship

In 2012, Prémat joined the Australia's leading touring car series, then known as V8 Supercars, driving a Holden VE Commodore for Garry Rogers Motorsport. After a disappointing first half of the season, where he struggled to adapt to the championship, he was rested for the 2012 Armor All Gold Coast 600, with Greg Ritter taking his place. He returned to racing at the following round in Abu Dhabi, and went on to finish the season with a best result of thirteenth place at Symmons Plains Raceway. Prémat remained with the team in 2013, starting the season with fourth place in the 2013 Clipsal 500 Adelaide. Despite showing front-running pace, particularly at the start of the season, he failed to achieve consistent results due to poor qualifying and incidents during the races.

In January 2014, Prémat announced he was leaving the team in a full-time capacity, however he would return to the team, which were now competing in a Volvo S60, for the endurance events, placing 5th in the Enduro Cup with full-time driver Scott McLaughlin. Prémat once again joined McLaughlin in the 2015 Enduro Cup, with a best result of fifth at the 2015 Supercheap Auto Bathurst 1000.

For 2016, Triple Eight Race Engineering poached Prémat to partner with Shane van Gisbergen in the Enduro Cup. The pairing went on to win the 2016 Enduro Cup, including three second-place finishes and Prémat's first race victory in the championship at the 2016 Castrol Gold Coast 600.

Racing record

Career summary

Complete Formula 3 Euro Series results
(key)

Complete A1 Grand Prix results
(key) (Races in bold indicate pole position) (Races in italics indicate fastest lap)

Complete GP2 Series results
(key) (Races in bold indicate pole position) (Races in italics indicate fastest lap)

Complete Formula One participations
(key)

Complete Deutsche Tourenwagen Masters results
(key)

24 Hours of Le Mans results

Supercars Championship results

Complete Bathurst 1000 results

References

External links

 Interview on SBS radio alexandre premat on SBS Radio
 Official website alexandrepremat.com
 Career statistic driverdb.com
 Career statistic Racing Reference

1982 births
Living people
24 Hours of Daytona drivers
24 Hours of Le Mans drivers
A1 Team France drivers
Blancpain Endurance Series drivers
Deutsche Tourenwagen Masters drivers
Formula Renault Eurocup drivers
European Le Mans Series drivers
French Formula Renault 2.0 drivers
French racing drivers
Formula 3 Euro Series drivers
GP2 Series drivers
Karting World Championship drivers
People from Juvisy-sur-Orge
WeatherTech SportsCar Championship drivers
Sportspeople from Essonne
ART Grand Prix drivers
Bathurst 1000 winners
20th-century French people
21st-century French people
A1 Grand Prix drivers
Team Penske drivers
Dick Johnson Racing drivers
Audi Sport drivers
Team Joest drivers
OAK Racing drivers
Oreca drivers
Garry Rogers Motorsport drivers
Phoenix Racing drivers
Nürburgring 24 Hours drivers
DAMS drivers
Michelin Pilot Challenge drivers
24H Series drivers